Tourism in Jharkhand refers to tourism in the Indian state of Jharkhand. Jharkhand is known for its waterfalls, hills and holy places.

Pilgrim places
Parasnath, Baidyanath Dham,  Rajrappa, Jagannath Temple and Dewri Temple are major religious places. The Bhadrakali temple in Itkhori built in 9th century A.D. The Buddhist stupas of Itkhori goes backs to 200 BC. It is holy place for Hindus, Buddhists and Jains. 

The Kapilnath Temple built by King Ram Shah in 1643 in another pilgrim place in Jharkhand.
The Rankini Temple of Jadugora, built in 1947–50, is famous in Jharkhand as well as in Odisha, Bengal and Bihar.

Hill Station
Netarhat is a hill station in the state. Parasnath is the highest mountain peak in the state of Jharkhand, and is  intervisible with Mount Everest over 450 km to the north

Waterfalls of Jharkhand

There are several waterfalls in Jharkand. They are as follows: 
Dassam Falls, Ranchi district
Hirni Falls, West Singhbhum
Hundru Falls, Ranchi district
Jonha Falls, Ranchi district
Lodh Falls, Latehar district
Lower Ghaghri Falls, Latehar district
Panchghagh Falls, Khunti district
Rajrappa, Ramgarh district
Sadni Falls, Gumla district
Sita Falls, Ramgarh district
Usri Falls, Giridih district

Dams
There are several dams in state. They are as follows:
Getalsud Dam
Kanke Dam
Khandoli Dam
Konar Dam
Massanjore Dam
Maithon Dam
Panchet Dam
Patratu Dam
Tenughat Dam
Chandil Dam

Lakes 
There are several reservoirs or lakes in state. They are as follows:

Dimna Lake
Hazaribagh Jheel
Raja Talab

Wildlife and national parks 
Jharkhand is known as Land of Forest. There are several Wildlife Sanctuaries and National Parks including Betla National Park, Hazaribag Wildlife Sanctuary, Dalma Wildlife Sanctuary, Gautam Budha Wildlife Sanctuary, Palkot Wildlife Sanctuary and Mahuadanr Wolf Sanctuary.

Culture
The state of Jharkhand has rich and vibrant tradition. It is known for its local festival of Karam, Sohrai, Phagua, Tusu and Sarhul.
There are several folk dance in State including Jhumair,  Domkach, Chhau, Firkal and Mundari dance, which represent its ancient heritage.

Famous dishes of the state include Chhilka Roti, Malpua, Pitha, Dhooska, Arsa roti, Dudhauri, and Panipuri (Gupchup).

Archaeological sites and heritage
There are several archaeological sites in state which are:
 Cave Paintings, Isko, Hazaribagh district  
 Megalith Prehistoric Monument, Pakri Barwadih,  Hazaribagh district
Palamu Forts, Palamu district
Maluti, Dumka district
Navratangarh, Gumla district

Museums
There are several museums in State which have preserved ancient artifacts discovered from state such as Stone tools, teracotta and sculpture.
Ranchi Science Centre, Ranchi
State Museum Hotwar, Ranchi
Tribal Research Institute and Museum, Ranchi
Sanskriti Museum & Art Gallery, Hazaribagh

Gallery

See also
List of Monuments of National Importance in Jharkhand

References

External links